Scott Anthony may refer to:
Scott D. Anthony (born 1975), author and managing partner of consulting firm Innosight
Scott Anthony, ring name for Scott Levy (born 1964), professional wrestler
Scott Anthony, major in the Third Colorado Cavalry

See also
Scott Antony, actor in Dead Cert

Anthony (surname)